Ampus is a commune in the Var department in the Provence-Alpes-Côte d'Azur region in southeastern France.

The hilltop village of Ampus is situated 14 km northwest of Draguignan.

See also
Communes of the Var department

References

External links

 Official Web site

Communes of Var (department)